Sara Sundelowitz is a former South African international lawn bowler.

Bowls career
In 1969 she won three gold medal's in the triples, fours and overall team event at the 1969 World Outdoor Bowls Championship in Sydney, Australia. She also won a gold medal in the team event (Taylor Trophy).

References

Living people
South African female bowls players
Bowls World Champions
Year of birth missing (living people)